Tovetumab is an anti-PDGFRa monoclonal antibody designed for the treatment of cancer. It was developed by MedImmune, and trialed for use in glioblastoma and non-small cell lung cancer. Development was discontinued in 2013.

This drug was developed by MedImmune, LLC.

References 

Monoclonal antibodies for tumors
Experimental cancer drugs
AstraZeneca brands